{{Infobox surname
| name = Corrin
|image= 
|image_size= 
|caption=
| meaning = "Son of Thórfinnr'"
| region = Isle of Man/Scotland/Ireland
| language = Gaelic
| variant = Makory, MacTorin, MacKoury, MacToryn, McThoryngt, M'Corrane, M'Corrin, McCorryn, McCoryn, McCorrin, McCorran, MacOran, Corean, Corran, Corine
| footnotes = 
}}

Corrin is a surname of Gaelic origin. It is a contraction of MacCorran or McCorryn, an anglicised form of the Gaelic MacTorin, meaning "son of Thórfinnr" (from Thórr the name of the Scandinavian thunder god + the ethnic designation Finnr). The surname is also a contraction of Mac Odhráin or fuller Mac GilleOdrain (from the personal name Odhrán). This surname is considered to be an patronymic name, meaning "son of Odhran". The personal name Odhrán means "pale-faced" or "the little pale-faced one". Corrin may also represent anglicized forms of Mac Corraidhin, meaning "little spear".

The earliest form was first documented on the Isle of Man as Maktory, MacThoryngt and later rendered as either MacCorrane or McCorryn, and later reduced as Corrane, in the year 1422 and as Corrin in 1504. This name first appeared in Manx Gaelic on the Isle of Man sometime pre-13th century, but its origination can also be found in the countries of Scotland (Scottish Gaelic) and Ireland (Irish Gaelic). In Scotland, any variation of the name may be considered a sept for their associations with clans such as Clan MacDonald (MacCorran), Clan Cameron (MacOran), or Clan Campbell (also MacOran).

Ethnic origins
Genealogists suggest a Norse-Gaelic origin through the Norse invasion of the British Isles, particularly through Norse settlements in Ireland and Scotland. People with this surname claim a descent from Thorfinn Ottarsson,  progenitor of the clan, and son of the Norse-Gaelic king, Óttar of Dublin. Thorfinn Ottarson, a powerful Manx chief and warrior from the Hebrides, was a significant influence on Somerled, who would nominate his son, Dugall, to claim the Lordship of the Isles from the Norse Vikings and unpopular ruler Godred Olafsson, and be proclaimed "King of the Isles". Ottarson would campaign alongside Somerled to invade the Kingdom of Mann and the Isles and the Kingdom of Dublin against the Vikings. Somerled soon led an invasion against Godred Olafsson at the Battle of the Isle of Man, which would be a success. As a result of the victory, Somerled seized the Kingdom of Mann and the Isles for himself.

However, some sources suggest that those who share this surname may be directly descended from The Britons of Strathclyde who migrated from the Kingdom of Strathclyde during the early middle ages. A number of articles published throughout the British Isles have concluded some evidence for migrations throughout the Isles. However, in some areas, such as in south-west Scotland, migrations were scarce and considered to be unlikely. While this may be the case, some genealogists have concluded that the people of the Isle of Man are genetically predominantly Scottish, and whose documented DNA are identical to those prevalent in the south-west regions of Scotland. While the earliest surviving documentary record of this name on the Isle of Man was from 1290, DNA experts were able to dig deeper into the male line to provide detailed analysis. Recent Y-DNA samples provide information about those who inhabited and lived on the Isle of Man for many centuries.

According to a study (whose purpose was to analyze DNA samples from patriarchs who are native to the Isle of Man), those who bore the name of Corrin appear to be of ancient Celtic origins, as most genealogists agree that those who are native or descended from any of the Celtic nations all share similar or identical DNA. In which case, patriarchs who shared the surname of Corrin held the Y-chromosome Haplogroup R1b in DNA matches and had come to the Isle of Man from either Celtic Britain or Ireland, which may support the Norse-Gaelic theoretical origin.

History
Isle of Man

On the Isle of Man, the name's first appearance appeared in the Parish Registers as Makory sometime in 1290 A.D. In 1293, a document concerning the "Outlawry of Donekan MacToryn" was presented to the Scottish lordships in a trial on IOM. The outlawry was considered to be "an error" in judgment and was officially annulled from the Kingdom of Scotland on the 28th of June, 1293. This took place during the time when invasions were taken place between the kingdoms of Scotland and England. In 1314, a petition to Edward II showed Duncan de MacKoury, a gentleman to Sir John of Argyll, at all times since the commencement of the war in Scotland, to show his allegiance to both Edward I and Edward II and to be granted. According to the petition, "His father and relations have died in the same service, all his lands, goods, and houses were destroyed by the Scots, and he himself has lived the whole of this year in Man in great distress, in the service of the King. Therefore he prays that the King will consider his estate, and grant him the ward and marriage of the body and lands of the heir of Nicholas de Ledewicke in Ireland, which are valued at twenty marks, together with the marriage of the wife of the said Nicholas, which ward belongs to the King, so that he may have a retreat for his wife and his children, so long as he remains in the service of the King". The request was granted.

While significant sources from the Isle of Man (along with most Manx genealogists) agree that the linage of Corrins are of Celtic origin, some argue that pre-1400s documents point to a Norse source through the name of Thorfin. J.J. Kneen, a historian on the Isle of Man, suggests the possibility in terms of places, such as Malew to have been given significant influences from the Norse. According to Kneen, "It is probable that Thore the son of Asser is identifiable with Thorfin the son of Oter mentioned in the Chronicles of Man. He was a famous chieftain of the Isles in the 12th century. It is now impossible to identify the site of this estate, but it was probably in the Parish of Malew".

The Thorfin clan is briefly mentioned in the Chronicles of Mann and the Isles:

While there are some similarities between the origins of Clan Corrin and Clan Thorfin (in terms of land), the differences lie within genetics that is present between these two families, instead of by name and influence on the Isle of Man.

The early family seat was located in Malew  in the vicinity of Rushen Abbey. This location was probably the source of the people called MacToryns before the name evolved later on pre-1400s. According to sources, the 'proto-Corrins' were most likely the McCorryns, McCoryns, and McCorrans in the 1500s onward. In Rushen, a clan based there, The Corrins of Ballagawne, was known to have held quarterland properties in the parishes of Arbory. Historically, they considered the Armstrong clan as their allies and Watsons as their rivals.

Scotland
In Scotland, The name of Corrin is derived from similar ethnic origins and can be found in the Highlands and Lowlands of Scotland.

In the Lowlands, they are associated with the family of McAdam, a clan based in the Scottish Lowlands, presumably in Ayrshire and/or Kirkcudbrightshire through intermarriages and alliances. Although MacAdam is a sept themselves, who have originally been branched off of Clan MacGregor in Argyllshire and Perthshire, they are a Scottish clan in their own right (there is a Clan Adam that exists).

The family names of MacCorran and Mac Oran are present in other parts in Scotland, predominantly in Argyllshire. The surname of MacCorran is also derived from similar origins and is found on the islands of Islay and Colonsay in Argyllshire, where they are considered to be a sept of Clan MacDonald of Dunnyveg, a branch of Clan Donald (or Clan MacDonald) in the Scottish Highlands. According to the official sept list of Clan Donald, the name is derived from the Gaelic MacGille Odhrain, meaning "son of the servant of St. Odhran". In addition, there is a medieval chapel called St Oran's Chapel that is located on the island of Iona in the Inner Hebrides off the west coast of Scotland. This chapel is dedicated to Oran of Iona, who was a companion of Saint Columba in Iona.

The name of Mac Oran is said to be a sept of Clan Campbell. In the sources provided by the Clan Campbell Society (North America), it is the same rendering of MacCorran, or more accurately, McCorran. According to family tradition, a young Campbell of Melfort took the alias name of McOran, after having killed a man named "MacColl" in the later seventeenth century. Having to leave Argyll, he took under the servitude of the Earl in Menteith, who in return awarded him a farm in Inchanoch. He married a Miss Haldane, the niece to Haldane of Lanrick, and the family prospered. Once they were away at sea, they reassumed the names of Campbell, having connections in Argyllshire.

There appears to be a documented name of Dugald M'Corran that appears in Fernoch, Kilmelford in 1698.

Ireland
In Ireland, the name is a variation of the last name Curran, which is Gaelic for O'Corraidhin'' or "descendant of Corraidhin", a personal name from a diminutive form of the byname derived from "corradh", meaning "spear".

Coat of Arms
While heraldry is relevant throughout the British Isles, coats of arms are rather scarce on the Isle of Man and are granted to very few families, most notably direct descendants of individuals who have been granted their right to inherit their ancestor's arms from the Christian or Quayle dynasties. Heraldry for the Isle of Man is regulated through the College of Arms, which guides individuals who wish to bear their own specific coats of arms. Some heraldric organizations, however, may be much more difficult to patent arms. Those of Scottish descent may find it much more arduous to register with the Court of the Lord Lyon as Scottish Armorial Laws are more restrictive.

While there is no historical record of a coat of arms for any Corrins, some families have advocated for an "official" coat of arms for the Corrin family. However, the College of Arms, Lord Lyon, (or other regulated heraldic jurisdiction) would find this inadvisable. According to laws in the United Kingdom, families cannot bear the right to an already registered coat of arms, and in Scotland, registering a similar or already pre-existing coat of arms is considered an unlawful act. College of Arms specifies that "Coats of arms belong to individuals. For any person to have a right to a coat of arms they must either have had it granted to them or be descended in the legitimate male line from a person to whom arms were granted or confirmed in the past". Meanwhile, in the United States, there is no heraldic authority and may register a coat of arms with an independent registry for an "official" copyrighted designs.

Notable People
Notable people with the surname include:

 Brian Corrin (born 1945), Canadian Politician
 Emma Corrin (born 1995), English actress
 Matthew Corrin (born 1982), Canadian businessman
 Penelope Corrin (born 1975), Canadian actor and writer
 John Corrin (1934–2005), Manx politician and Government Minister
 Jack Corrin (1932-2019), Manx politician and deemster on the Isle of Man
 Thomas Corrin (1878–1936), English footballer

See also
Manx surnames
Curran (surname)
Scottish clan
Chronicles of the Kings of Mann and the Isles
Dune: The Battle of Corrin

References

Manx-language surnames